The Filitelnic gas field is a natural gas field in the Filitelnic village of Bălăuşeri commune, Mureș County, Romania lying in the center of the Transylvanian Basin, a major natural gas-producing region. It was discovered in 1958 and is developed by Romgaz. It began production in 1961 and produces natural gas and condensates. The Filitelnic gas field is the second largest natural gas field in Romania.

References

Natural gas fields in Romania